Pink Guitar may refer to:

Music
 Henry Mancini: Pink Guitar, a 2004 compilation album produced by James Jensen
 "Pink Guitar", a song on Reba McEntire's 2009 album Keep on Loving You